Dieter Rehm (born 29 January 1974) is a Swiss gymnast. He finished in eighth in the vault final and seventh in the horizontal bar final at the 2000 Summer Olympics.

References

External links
 

1974 births
Living people
Swiss male artistic gymnasts
Olympic gymnasts of Switzerland
Gymnasts at the 2000 Summer Olympics
Sportspeople from Zürich
20th-century Swiss people